Sir Anthony Herbert Everington , known as Sam Everington, is a GP at a health centre within the Bromley by Bow Centre, in Tower Hamlets, an area of East London.

He has held the role of chair of NHS Tower Hamlets Clinical Commissioning Group since its creation in April 2013. Under his chairmanship Tower Hamlets Clinical Commissioning Group was awarded Clinical Commissioning Group of the year by the Health Service Journal in November 2014. The judges praised the group's “strong leadership, especially clinical leadership, while retaining patient focus.”

In 2018 he was appointed to the role of chair of the London Clinical Commissioning Council, London's 32 clinical commissioning group chairs. In 2018 he became a member of the national NHS Property board and was also appointed as an associate non-executive member of the board of NHS Resolution.

Dr Everington practices at a GP partnership which is part of the Bromley by Bow Centre, an innovative community organisation with more than 100 projects under its roof supporting wider determinants of health. He is an advocate for social prescribing. Considered a founder of the social prescribing movement, he says "...it focuses on what matters to patients. This increases satisfaction, delivers better health outcomes and reduces prescribing and referral costs."

Training and appointments
After completing a law degree and Bar finals from Inns of Court School of Law, he qualified as a barrister in 1976.

He studied medicine at Royal Free Hospital School of Medicine from 1979 to 1984. In the 1980s, he made his name as a campaigning junior doctor, highlighting the dangerously long hours that doctors then worked (an average of 84 hours a week). To do this he slept outside the Royal London Hospital.

In 1989, he became, and continues to be, a council member of the British Medical Association, holding the role of deputy chair from 2004 to 2007.

In 1993, research into racial discrimination in recruitment of medical professionals led Everington and Prof. Aneez Esmail to be arrested and charged with making fraudulent job applications. For research they applied for vacancies in the name of people with traditional Anglo-saxon names and Asian names. Each applicant had similar experience and qualifications for the roles. They found that the applications with Anglo-saxon names were twice as likely to be shortlisted than those with Asian names. Everington and Esmail were cleared of the charges. The research was published in the British Medical Journal. The General Medical Council said that the behaviour was unbecoming of the medical profession - but took no action against the doctors.

The results of the research provided the first documented evidence of discrimination in the NHS. In 1994 both, Everington and Professor Esmail, received an award from the Campaign for Freedom of Information for this work. Despite this, Everington was appointed as a member of the General Medical Council, a role he held from 2009 to 2012.
Everington was one of the first medics on scene at the Tavistock Square bus bombings in 2005.

He was a member of the Department of Health's Art and Health Working party in 2006. In 2007/08 he was appointed as an adviser to the Health Minister (Primary Care Access).

He initially backed Andrew Lansley's Health and Social Care health reforms but later reversed his stance. He says, that "while clinical commissioning is rightly well supported, the huge re-organisation under the Health and Social Care Act was unnecessary".

He is a former-trustee of the King's Fund, appointed in 2014.

Honours and awards

 In 1999, he was awarded an OBE for services to inner city primary care.
 Fellow, Queen Mary University, 2015.
 Knighted in the 2015 New Year Honours for services to primary care.

 The Health Service Journal listed him as the 43rd most influential person in the English NHS in 2015.
 Honorary Professor, School of Medicine and Dentistry, Queen Mary University, 2016.

References

External links
 Bromley By Bow Centre

British general practitioners
Officers of the Order of the British Empire
Knights Bachelor
Living people
1957 births